The International Peace Belt is a living symbol of the peaceful unity of all nations.

Creation 

In the summer of 2003, Wendy Black Nasta (a Connecticut-based jewelry designer) and her apprentices Katie Rosenblatt and Margaret Sola began working on the belt. They designed and built a sterling silver belt draped with coins and gems representing, to date, 155 countries.

When it was completed 115 countries were represented with the ultimate goal of having all 191 countries represented.

The following countries have coins incorporated into the belt:

Afghanistan, Argentina, Austria, Bahamas, Belgium, Brazil, Bermuda, Belize, British Caribbean Territories (Eastern Group 1961), Bangladesh, Chile, Columbia, Central Africa, Canada, China, Czech Republic, Costa Rica, Cayman Islands, Dominican Republic, Denmark, Egypt, East Africa, East Caribbean States, Euro (1 cent, 5 cent, 10 cent), Finland, France, Greece, Guatemala, Ghana, Germany, Hong-Kong, Honduras, Israel, Indonesia, India, Ireland, Iraq, Italy, Jamaica, Jordan, Latvia, Luxembourg, Mexico, Magyar, Malaysia, Malta, Morocco, Netherlands, Poland, Philippines, Peru, Portugal, Pakistan, Sweden, South Korea, Singapore, Spain, Trinidad and Tobago, Thailand, United Arab Emirates, United States, Uruguay, Vatican City, Venezuela, Vietnam, West Africa, Yugoslavia, Zambia.

The following stones are incorporated into the belt:

Amber, amytrene, amethyst, aventurine, aquamarine, agate, abalone shell (from the Siletz Tribe in Oregon), black onyx, bone, bear fetish (pipestone), bamboo coral, blue shell, carnelian agate, citrine, coral (Italian), carved wood, eilot, emerald, fluorite, goldstone, garnet, green onyx, green pearl, green tourmaline, hematite, hessonite garnet, iolite, jade (carved Buddha from Vietnam), jasper, jet, kyanite, lapis lazuli, lemon citrine, labradorite, mother-of-pearl carved fetishes, malachite, moonstone, peridot, pearls (white, grey, green, red, brown), quartz crystal, rutilated quartz, rainbow moonstone, rubellite, rose quartz, spectrolite, sodalite, scarab (from Egypt), sapphire, soapstone, smoky quartz, turquoise, tourmaline, tiger eye, vasuvialite, watermelon tourmaline, yellow onyx.

Caretakers 

The International Peace Belt relies on caretakers and volunteers to travel from one destination to the next.

Wendy’s cousin Sara Morgues and friend Meghan Uhrich were the belt’s first caretakers. The pair were traveling to India to attend the Golden Jubilee for World Peace honoring the 50th birthday of Amritanadamayi (Aka Ammachi), a saint and guru from India. Sara offered to carry the belt and have it blessed by Ammachi. The belt would up being worn by a person from Ammachi’s ashram and led the peace procession of 150,000 people, thus taking on a life of its own.

Foundation 

While in India, there was an interest in raising funds to pay for the extended travel of the belt. It was then that Wendy officially established the non-profit foundation Artists for World Peace to raise money for the ongoing travels and missions of the International Peace Belt.

The foundation has grown into a registered 501(c)(3) Non Profit organization, raising funds for grass roots organizations in communities around the world through the arts. The Children of Peace program was created to pay for the living and educational expenses of children all over the world.

Notes

External links
Artists For World Peace Official Website

Belts (clothing)
Individual items of jewellery
Peace symbols
2003 works